The 2019 Tennessee Tech Golden Eagles football team represented Tennessee Technological University as a member of Ohio Valley Conference (OVC) during the 2019 NCAA Division I FCS football season. Led by second-year head coach Dewayne Alexander, the Golden Eagles compiled an overall record of 6–6 overall with a mark of 3–5 in conference play, tying for fifth place in the OVC. Tennessee Tech played home games at Tucker Stadium in Cookeville, Tennessee.

Previous season

The Golden Eagles finished the 2018 season 1–10, 1–7 in OVC play to finish in last place.

Preseason

Preseason coaches' poll
The OVC released their preseason coaches' poll on July 22, 2019. The Golden Eagles were picked to finish in ninth place.

Preseason All-OVC team
The Golden Eagles did not have any players selected to the preseason all-OVC team.

Schedule

Game summaries

Samford

at Miami (OH)

Virginia–Wise

at Western Illinois

at Eastern Illinois

at Southeast Missouri State

UT Martin

Austin Peay

at Murray State

Jacksonville State

at Eastern Kentucky

Tennessee State

References

Tennessee Tech
Tennessee Tech Golden Eagles football seasons
Tennessee Tech Golden Eagles football